The 60th Regiment Massachusetts Volunteer Infantry was an infantry regiment that served in the Union Army during the American Civil War from 1864 to 1865.

History
The regiment began its organization at Readville, Massachusetts during the summer of 1864, with the volunteers being mustered in from 14 to 30 July. On 1 August, they were ordered to report to Washington, DC and from there to Baltimore, Maryland. When their commanding officer, Colonel Ansel Dyer Wass (formerly of the 6th Massachusetts Militia) joined them, the regiment was sent to Indianapolis, Indiana. They were sent there "on account of the conspiracy of an extensive organization known as the Knights of the Golden Circle or Sons of Liberty". They remained in Indiana during their term of service, and were mustered out on 30 Nov 1864.

While camped in Indianapolis during an October 1864 gubernatorial election, some controversy with the regiment came about. It was claimed that some soldiers of this regiment "voted a dozen times each, and some claimed they had done so twenty-five times for the Republican candidate", Oliver P. Morton, who was elected governor.

Casualties
They were not involved in any battles or skirmishes, but lost 11 soldiers to disease.

See also
List of Massachusetts Civil War Units
Massachusetts in the American Civil War

Notes

References

External links
60th Regiment, Massachusetts Infantry (Militia)
60th Massachusetts

Units and formations of the Union Army from Massachusetts
1864 establishments in Massachusetts
Military units and formations established in 1864
Military units and formations disestablished in 1865
Military units and formations disestablished in 1864